Shara Proctor (born 16 September 1988) is a British former long jumper born in Anguilla. She is the national record holder of both Anguilla and Great Britain. On 28 August 2015 at the World Championships in Beijing she became the first British, female, long-jumper to jump over 7 metres (7.07), setting a new British record and earning a world championship silver medal in the process. She also won the 2013 IAAF Diamond League in the event. Her younger sister is the Anguillan sprinter Shinelle Proctor.

Career

Representing Anguilla
She competed at the 2006 Commonwealth Games and the 2007 World Championships for Anguilla, but without reaching the final round.

In November 2010, she announced that she would be competing for Great Britain at events held by the IAAF, as Anguilla is a British Overseas Territory and cannot send delegations to the Olympic Games for not having your National Olympic Committee (NOC) recognized.
 A British Overseas Territory, Anguilla does not have a National Olympic Committee (NOC) of its own; However, this would not prevent Proctor from competing for Great Britain, as the responsibilities of the National Olympic Committee for the territory are the responsibility of the British Olympic Association (BOA). However, this would not happen at World Athletics competitions and at the Commonwealth Games because Anguilla is an effective member of both associations. After the change of nation, she  was invited to compete for the English team at the 2014 Commonwealth Games in Glasgow.

Representing Great Britain and England
In 2012, Proctor won her first senior medal for Great Britain, a bronze medal in the long jump in the IAAF World Indoor Athletics Championships, after a British national indoor record leap of 6.89 metres.

Her longest jumps outdoors are 7.07 metres in the long jump, achieved in August 2015 in Beijing; and 13.74 metres in the triple jump, achieved in May 2009 in Greensboro.

In November 2012 Proctor moved from her training base at Embry-Riddle Aeronautical University, Daytona Beach to Loughborough when her coach Rana Reider was recruited to work at UK Athletics. On Reider's move to the Netherlands, Proctor relocated to stay with her coach.

On 28 August 2015 at the World Championships in Beijing she became the first British female long jumper to jump over 7 metres (7.07) thus setting a new British record, and earning a silver medal.
Proctor announced her retirement in 2022.

Achievements

References

External links
  Shara Proctor – University of Florida athlete profile at GatorZone.com

1988 births
Living people
People from The Valley, Anguilla
Anguillan long jumpers
Anguillan female athletes
British female long jumpers
English female long jumpers
Olympic female long jumpers
Olympic athletes of Great Britain
Athletes (track and field) at the 2012 Summer Olympics
Athletes (track and field) at the 2016 Summer Olympics
Commonwealth Games competitors for Anguilla
Commonwealth Games medallists in athletics
Commonwealth Games bronze medallists for England
Athletes (track and field) at the 2006 Commonwealth Games
Athletes (track and field) at the 2014 Commonwealth Games
Athletes (track and field) at the 2018 Commonwealth Games
World Athletics Championships athletes for Anguilla
World Athletics Championships athletes for Great Britain
World Athletics Championships medalists
British Athletics Championships winners
Diamond League winners
Florida Gators women's track and field athletes
Black British sportswomen
Medallists at the 2018 Commonwealth Games